Albrecht Kauw (1621–1681) was a Swiss still-life painter, cartographer and a painter of vedute.

Biography
Kauw was born in Strasbourg, then moved to Bern in 1640. He painted a large number of works for public buildings and for various chateaux. Kauw primarily painted still lifes and landscapes. He trained his son Albrecht Kauw the Younger to also be a painter.   He died in Bern.

References

17th-century Swiss painters
Swiss male painters
1681 deaths
1621 births
Artists from Strasbourg
Artists from Bern